Angelo Pisani (died 1475) was a Roman Catholic prelate who served as Bishop of Bagnoregio (1462–1475).

Biography
On 26 April 1462, Angelo Pisani was appointed during the papacy of Pope Pius II as Bishop of Bagnoregio. He served as Bishop of Bagnoregio until his death in 1475 (although his death date is not certain).

References

External links and additional sources
 (for Chronology of Bishops) 
 (for Chronology of Bishops) 

15th-century Italian Roman Catholic bishops
1475 deaths
Bishops appointed by Pope Pius II